Larsenaikia is a genus of flowering plants in the tribe Gardenieae of the family Rubiaceae. Its native range is Eastern and Northern Australia.

It contains three species — L. jardinei, L. ochreata, and L. suffruticosa — formerly classified in Gardenia, and possibly belonging to Kailarsenia.

Larsenaikia is a taxonomic anagram derived from the name of the confamilial genus Kailarsenia. The latter name is a taxonomic patronym honoring Kai Larsen, professor of botany at Århus University, Denmark.

References 

Rubiaceae genera
Plants described in 1993
Gardenieae